Pectinivalva libera is a moth of the family Nepticulidae. It is found along the southeastern coast of New South Wales.

The host plant is unknown, but probably a Myrtaceae species. They probably mine the leaves of their host plant.

External links
 Australian Faunal Directory
 Australian Nepticulidae (Lepidoptera): Redescription of the named species

Moths of Australia
Nepticulidae
Moths described in 1906
Taxa named by Edward Meyrick